Robert Hestmann (born July 23, 1988) is a Norwegian professional ice hockey goaltender who is currently playing for Kalmar HC of the Swedish Hockeyettan.

He participated at the 2011 IIHF World Championship as a member of the Norway men's national ice hockey team.

External links

1988 births
Living people
Ice hockey people from Oslo
Norwegian ice hockey goaltenders
Hasle-Løren IL players
Huddinge IK players
Lørenskog IK players
Storhamar Dragons players
Vålerenga Ishockey players
Norwegian expatriate ice hockey people
Norwegian expatriate sportspeople in Sweden